Epinotia rasdolnyana is a species of moth of the family Tortricidae. It is found in north-eastern China, Taiwan, Korea, Japan and Russia.

The wingspan is 15–21 mm.

The larvae feed on Acer pictum and Acer ukurunduense.

References

Moths described in 1882
Eucosmini